Doctrine (from , meaning "teaching, instruction") is a codification of beliefs or a body of teachings or instructions, taught principles or positions, as the essence of teachings in a given branch of knowledge or in a belief system. The etymological Greek analogue is "catechism".

Often the word doctrine specifically suggests a body of religious principles as promulgated by a church. Doctrine may also refer to a principle of law, in the common-law traditions, established through a history of past decisions.

Religious usage

Examples of religious doctrines include:
 Christian theology: 
 Doctrines such as the Trinity, the virgin birth and atonement
 The Salvation Army Handbook of Doctrine
Transubstantiation and Marian teachings in Roman Catholic theology. The department of the Roman Curia which deals with questions of doctrine is called the Congregation for the Doctrine of the Faith.
 The distinctive Calvinist doctrine of "double" predestination
The Methodist Church of Great Britain refers to the "doctrines to which the preachers of the Methodist Church are pledged" as doctrinal standards 
Other Christian Doctrine
 Yuga in Hinduism
 Postulation or Syādvāda in Jainism
 The Four Noble Truths in Buddhism

Roman Catholic and Orthodox doctrine generally comes from the writings of the Church Fathers, which has been clarified in various Ecumenical councils. Short versions can be found in brief statements of Christian doctrine, in prayer books. Longer versions take the form of catechisms. Protestants generally reject Christian tradition and instead derive their doctrine solely from the Bible.

Philosophical usage
 Epicurus' 40 Principal Doctrines, the first four of which make up the Tetrapharmakos

Measure of religiosity
According to sociologist Mervin Verbit, doctrine may be understood as one of the key components of religiosity. He divides doctrine into four categories: content, frequency (degree to which it may occupy the person's mind), intensity and centrality. Each of these may vary from one religion to the next, within that religious tradition.

In this sense, doctrine is similar to Charles Glock's "belief" dimension of religiosity.

Military usage

The term also applies to the concept of an established procedure to execute an operation in warfare. The typical example is tactical doctrine in which a standard set of maneuvers, kinds of troops and weapons are employed as a default approach to a kind of attack.

Examples of military doctrines include:
 Guerre de course
 Hit-and-run tactics
 Mahanian of late 19th up to mid-20th century
 Manhunting doctrine, or assured individual destruction
 Reagan Doctrine of the Cold War
 Shock and awe
 Soviet deep battle of World War II
 Trench warfare of World War I

Almost every military organization has its own doctrine, sometimes written, sometimes unwritten. Some military doctrines are transmitted through training programs. More recently, in modern peacekeeping operations, which involve both civilian and military operations, more comprehensive (not just military) doctrines are now emerging such as the 2008 United Nations peacekeeping operations' "Capstone Doctrine" which speaks to integrated civilian and military operations.

Political usage

By definition, political doctrine is "[a] policy, position or principle advocated, taught or put into effect concerning the acquisition and exercise of the power to govern or administrate in society." The term political doctrine is sometimes wrongly identified with political ideology. However, doctrine lacks the actional aspect of ideology. It is mainly a theoretical discourse, which "refers to a coherent sum of assertions regarding what a particular topic should be" (Bernard Crick). Political doctrine is based on a rationally elaborated set of values, which may precede the formation of a political identity per se. It is concerned with philosophical orientations on a meta-theoretical level.

Legal usage
A legal doctrine is a body of interrelated rules (usually of common law and built over a long period of time) associated with a legal concept or principle. For example, the doctrine of frustration of purpose now has many tests and rules applicable with regards to each other and can be contained within a "bubble" of frustration. In a court session a defendant may refer to the doctrine of justification.

It can be seen that a branch of law contains various doctrines, which in turn contain various rules or tests. The test of non-occurrence of crucial event is part of the doctrine of frustration which is part of contract law. Doctrines can grow into a branch of law; restitution is now considered a branch of law separate to contract and tort.

See also
 Betancourt Doctrine

References

External links
 
 

 
Belief
Dogmatism
Dogma